Sir William Matthew Flinders Petrie  ( – ), commonly known as simply Sir Flinders Petrie, was a British Egyptologist and a pioneer of systematic methodology in archaeology and the preservation of artefacts. He held the first chair of Egyptology in the United Kingdom, and excavated many of the most important archaeological sites in Egypt in conjunction with his wife, Hilda Urlin. Some consider his most famous discovery to be that of the Merneptah Stele, an opinion with which Petrie himself concurred. Undoubtedly at least as important is his 1905 discovery and correct identification of the character of the Proto-Sinaitic script, the ancestor of almost all alphabetic scripts.

Petrie developed the system of dating layers based on pottery and ceramic findings. He remains controversial for his pro-eugenics views; he was a dedicated believer in the superiority of the Northern peoples over the Latinate and Southern peoples.

Early life
Petrie was born on 3 June 1853 in Charlton, Kent, England, the son of William Petrie (1821–1908) and Anne (née Flinders) (1812–1892). Anne was the daughter of British Captain Matthew Flinders, who led the first circumnavigation of Australia (and after whom Petrie was named). William Petrie was an electrical engineer who developed carbon arc lighting and later developed chemical processes for Johnson, Matthey & Co.

Petrie was raised in a Christian household (his father being a member of the Plymouth Brethren), and was educated at home. He had no formal education. His father taught his son how to survey accurately, laying the foundation for his archaeological career. At the age of eight, he was tutored in French, Latin, and Greek, until he had a collapse and was taught at home. He also ventured his first archaeological opinion aged eight, when friends visiting the Petrie family were describing the unearthing of the Brading Roman Villa in the Isle of Wight. The boy was horrified to hear the rough shovelling out of the contents, and protested that the earth should be pared away, inch by inch, to see all that was in it and how it lay. "All that I have done since," he wrote when he was in his late seventies, "was there to begin with, so true it is that we can only develop what is born in the mind. I was already in archaeology by nature."

Academic career
The chair of Edwards Professor of Egyptian Archaeology and Philology at University College London was set up and funded in 1892 following a bequest from Amelia Edwards, who died suddenly in that year. Petrie's supporter since 1880, Edwards had instructed that he should be its first incumbent. He continued to excavate in Egypt after taking up the professorship, training many of the best archaeologists of the day.
In 1904 Petrie published Methods and Aims in Archaeology, the definitive work of his time, in which he defined the goals and methodology of his profession along with the more practical aspects of archaeology—such as details of excavation, including the use of cameras in the field. Insights include the contention that research results were dependent on the personality of the archaeologist, who, he felt, needed to possess broad knowledge as well as insatiable curiosity. His own abundance of that characteristic was never questioned.

In 1913 Petrie sold his large collection of Egyptian antiquities to University College, London, where it is now housed in the Petrie Museum of Egyptian Archaeology. One of his trainees, Howard Carter, went on to discover the tomb of Tutankhamun in 1922.

Petrie's mental capacity

Archaeology career

In Britain
In his teenage years, Petrie surveyed British prehistoric monuments, commencing with the late Romano-British 'British Camp' that lay within yards of his family home in Charlton, in attempts to understand their geometry. At 19 he produced the most accurate survey of Stonehenge.

Giza survey
His father had corresponded with Piazzi Smyth about his theories of the Great Pyramid  and Petrie travelled to Egypt in early 1880 to make an accurate survey of Giza, making him the first to properly investigate how the pyramids there were constructed; many theories had been advanced on this, and Petrie read them all, but none was based on first hand observation or logic.

Petrie's published reports of this triangulation survey, and his analysis of the architecture of Giza therein, was exemplary in its methodology and accuracy, disproving Smyth's theories and still providing much of the basic data regarding the pyramid plateau to this day. On that visit, he was appalled by the rate of destruction of monuments (some listed in guidebooks had been worn away completely since then) and mummies. He described Egypt as "a house on fire, so rapid was the destruction" and felt his duty to be that of a "salvage man, to get all I could, as quickly as possible and then, when I was 60, I would sit and write it all."

Egypt Exploration Fund affiliation
Returning to England at the end of 1880, Petrie wrote a number of articles and then met Amelia Edwards, journalist and patron of the Egypt Exploration Fund (now the Egypt Exploration Society), who became his strong supporter and later appointed him as professor at her Egyptology chair at University College London. Impressed by his scientific approach, the university 
offered him work as the successor to Édouard Naville. Petrie accepted the position and was given the sum of £250 per month to cover the excavation expenses. In November 1884, Petrie arrived in Egypt to begin his excavations.

Tanis dig
He first went to a New Kingdom site at Tanis, with 170 workmen. He cut out the middle man role of foreman on this and all subsequent excavations, taking complete overall control himself and removing pressure on the workmen from the foreman to discover finds quickly but sloppily. Though he was regarded as an amateur and dilettante by more established Egyptologists, this made him popular with his workers, who found several small but significant finds that would have been lost under the old system.

Tell Nebesheh dig
In 1886, while working for the Egypt Exploration Fund, Petrie excavated at Tell Nebesheh in the Eastern Nile Delta. This site is located 8 miles southeast of Tanis and, among the remains of an ancient temple there, Petrie found a royal sphinx, now located at the Museum of Fine Arts, Boston.

Nile and Sehel Island
By the end of the Tanis dig, he ran out of funding but, reluctant to leave the country in case it was renewed, he spent 1887 cruising the Nile taking photographs as a less subjective record than sketches. During this time, he also climbed rope ladders at Sehel Island near Aswan to draw and photograph thousands of early Egyptian inscriptions on a cliff face, recording embassies to Nubia, famines and wars.

Fayum burials
By the time he reached Aswan, a telegram had reached there to confirm the renewal of his funding. He then went straight to the burial site at Fayum, particularly interested in post-30 BC burials, which had not previously been fully studied. He found intact tombs and 60 of the famous portraits, and discovered from inscriptions on the mummies that they were kept with their living families for generations before burial. Under Auguste Mariette's arrangements, he sent 50% of these portraits to the Egyptian department of antiquities.

However, when he later found that Gaston Maspero placed little value on them and left them open to the elements in a yard behind the museum to deteriorate, he angrily demanded that they all be returned, forcing Maspero to pick the 12 best examples for the museum to keep and return 48 to Petrie, who sent them to London for a special showing at the British Museum. Resuming work, he discovered the village of the Pharaonic tomb-workers.

Palestine, Tell Hesi and Wadi Rababah
In 1890, Petrie made the first of his many forays into Palestine, leading to much important archaeological work. His six-week excavation of Tell el-Hesi (which was mistakenly identified as Lachish) that year represents the first scientific excavation of an archaeological site in the Holy Land. Petrie surveyed a group of tombs in the Wadi al-Rababah (the biblical Hinnom) of Jerusalem, largely dating to the Iron Age and early Roman periods. Here, in these ancient monuments, Petrie discovered that two different types of cubit had been used as units of length.

Amarna
From 1891, he worked on the temple of Aten at Tell-el-Amarna, discovering a  New Kingdom painted pavement of garden and animals and hunting scenes. This became a tourist attraction but, as there was no direct access to the site, tourists wrecked neighbouring fields on their way to it. This made local farmers deface the paintings, and it is only thanks to Petrie's copies that their original appearance is known.

Discovery of the 'Israel' or Merneptah stele
In early 1896, Petrie and his archaeological team were conducting excavations on a temple in Petrie's area of concession at Luxor. This temple complex was located just north of the original funerary temple of Amenhotep III, which had been built on a flood plain. They were initially surprised that this building which they were excavating
 was also attributed to Amenophis III since only his name appeared on blocks strewn over the site...Could one king have had two mortuary temples? Petrie dug and soon solved the puzzle: the temple had been built by Merneptah or Merenptah, the son and successor of Ramesses II, almost entirely from stone which had been plundered from the temple of Amenophis III nearby. Statues of the latter had been smashed and the pieces thrown into the foundations; fragments of couchant stone jackals, which must have once formed an imposing avenue approaching the pylon, and broken drums gave some idea of the splendour of the original temple. A statue of Merneptah himself was found—the first known portrait of this king....Better was to follow: two splendid stelae were found, both of them usurped on the reverse side by Merneptah, who had turned them face to the wall. One, beautifully carved, showed Amenophis III in battle with Nubians and Syrians; the other, of black granite, was over ten feet high, larger than any stela previously known; the original text commemorated the building achievements of Amenophis and described the beauties and magnificence of the temple in which it had stood. When it could be turned over, an inscription of Merneptah was revealed, recording his triumphs over the Libyans and the Peoples of the Sea; [Wilhelm] Spiegelberg [a noted German philologist] came over to read it, and near the end of the text he was puzzled by one name, that of a people or tribe whom Merenptah had victoriously smitten-"I.si.ri.ar?" It was Petrie whose quick imaginative mind leapt to the solution: "Israel!" Spiegelberg agreed that it must be so. "Won't the reverends be pleased?" was his comment. At dinner that evening Petrie prophesied: "This stele will be better known in the world than anything else I have found." It was the first mention of the word "Israel" in any Egyptian text and the news made headlines when it reached the English papers.

During the field season of 1895/6, at the Ramesseum, Petrie and the young German Egyptologist Wilhelm Spiegelberg became friends. Spiegelberg was in charge of the edition of many texts discovered by his British colleague, and Petrie offered important collections of artefacts to the University of Strasbourg. In 1897, the Kaiser-Wilhelms-Universität Straßburg gratefully conferred to Petrie the title of doctor honoris causa, and in June 1902 he was elected a Fellow of the Royal Society (FRS).

Hu and Abadiya cemeteries
From 1889 to 1899 Petrie directed a team excavating over 17 cemeteries containing numerous graves between Hu and Abadiya, Egypt. The dig team included Beatrice Orme, David Randall-MacIver, Arthur Cruttenden Mace, Henrietta Lawes and Hilda Petrie. Predynastic, Old Kingdom, Middle Kingdom and Roman graves were excavated and published at 'Diospolis Parva'.

Discovery of the Proto-Sinaitic script 

In the winter of 1905, Petrie and his wife Hilda were conducting a series of archaeological excavations in the Sinai Peninsula. During a dig at Serabit el-Khadim, an extremely lucrative turquoise mine used during the Twelfth and Thirteenth Dynasty and again between the Eighteenth and mid-Twentieth Dynasty, Petrie discovered a series of inscriptions at the site's massive invocative temple to Hathor, as well as some fragmentary inscriptions in the mines themselves. Petrie immediately recognized hieroglyphic characters in the inscriptions, but upon closer inspection realized the script was wholly alphabetic and not the combination of logograms and syllabics characteristic of Egyptian script proper. He thus assumed that the script showed a script that the turquoise miners had devised themselves, using linear signs that they had borrowed from hieroglyphics. He published his findings in London the following year. He had discovered and correctly identified the character of the Proto-Sinaitic script, the ancestor of almost all alphabetic scripts.

Later life
In 1923 Petrie was knighted for services to British Archaeology and Egyptology.

Palestine: Jemmeh and Ajjul
The focus of his work shifted permanently to Palestine in 1926. From 1927 until 1938, he excavated in Palestine under the auspices of the American School of Research. he discovered ruins of ten cities in Tell el-Hesi. He began excavating several important sites in the south-west of Palestine, including Tell Jemmeh and Tell el-Ajjul.

Luxor and the novel excavation system
In parallel with his work in Palestine, Petrie became interested in early Egypt. In 1928, while digging a cemetery at Luxor, this proved so huge that he devised an entirely new excavation system, including comparison charts for finds, which is still used today.

Move to Jerusalem
In 1933, on retiring from his professorship, he moved permanently to Jerusalem, where he lived with Lady Petrie at the British School of Archaeology, then temporarily headquartered at the American School of Oriental Research (today the W. F. Albright Institute of Archaeological Research).

Death and preservation of head

Sir Flinders Petrie died in Jerusalem on 28 July 1942. His body was interred in the Protestant Cemetery on Mount Zion, but he donated his head (and thus his brain) to the Royal College of Surgeons of London. World War II was then at its height, and the head was delayed in transit. After being stored in a jar in the college basement, its label fell off and no one knew to whom the head belonged. However, it was eventually identified, and is now stored, but not displayed, at the Royal College of Surgeons.

There is a popular legend that Hilda brought back her husband's head in a hat box from Jerusalem after the war. But letters in the Petrie Museum archive illustrate that this legend is not true.

Personal life
Petrie married Hilda Urlin (1871–1957) in London on 26 November 1896. The couple had two children, John (1907–1972) and Ann (1909–1989). The family originally lived in Hampstead, London, where an English Heritage blue plaque has been placed on the building in which they lived at 5 Cannon Place. John Flinders Petrie became a noted mathematician, who gave his name to the Petrie polygon.

Legacy

Scientific excavation methods
Flinders Petrie's painstaking recording and study of artefacts set new standards in archaeology. He wrote: "I believe the true line of research lies in the noting and comparison of the smallest details."

Relative dating through pottery

By linking styles of pottery with periods, he was the first to use seriation in Egyptology, a new method for establishing the chronology of a site.

Teacher and mentor
Petrie was also responsible for mentoring and training a whole generation of Egyptologists, including Howard Carter. On the centennial of Petrie's birth in 1953, his widow Hilda Petrie created a student travel scholarship to Egypt.

Egypt findings
Many thousands of artefacts recovered during excavations led by Petrie can be found in museums worldwide.

Petrie Medal for archaeology
The Petrie Medal was created in celebration of Petrie's seventieth birthday, when funds were raised to commission and produce 20 medals to be awarded "once in every three years for distinguished work in Archaeology, preferably to a British subject". The first medal was awarded to Petrie himself (1925), and the first few recipients included Sir Aurel Stein (1928), Sir Arthur Evans (1931), Abbé Henri Breuil (1934), Prof. J.D. Beazley (1937), Sir Mortimer Wheeler (1950), Prof. J.B. Wace (1953), and Sir Leonard Woolley (1957).

Racist views
Petrie remains controversial for his pro-eugenics racial views, and was a dedicated believer in the superiority of the Northern peoples over the Latinate and Southern peoples. In his 1906 sociological series "Question of the day", he expressed his far right views and racial views, ascribing social problems of England to racial degeneration brought on by communism, trade unionism, and government assistance to people groups he found inferior. These racial views spilled over into his academic opinions. Believing that society is the product of racial biology, he contended that the culture of Ancient Egypt was derived from an invading Caucasoid "Dynastic Race", which had entered Egypt from the south in late predynastic times, conquered the "inferior, exhausted mulatto" natives, and slowly introduced the higher Dynastic civilisation as it interbred with them. Petrie engaged in fierce controversies with the British Museum's Egyptology expert E. A. Wallis Budge, who contended that the religion of the Egyptians was not introduced by invaders, but was essentially identical to that of the people of northeastern and central Africa; however, most of their colleagues judged Petrie's opinion to be more "scientific".

Palestinian archaeology
His involvement in Palestinian archaeology was examined in the exhibition "A Future for the Past: Petrie's Palestinian Collection".

Memorial
In August 2012 more than a hundred people gathered at Petrie's grave, to commemorate the 70th anniversary of his death. His headstone is marked only with his name and an ankh symbol, the Egyptian hieroglyph for "life."

Published work

A number of Petrie's discoveries were presented to the Royal Archaeological Society and described in the society's Archaeological Journal by his good friend and fellow archaeologist Flaxman Charles John Spurrell. Petrie published a total of 97 books.
 Tel el-Hesy (Lachish). London: Palestine Exploration Fund.
 "The Tomb-Cutter's Cubits at Jerusalem," Palestine Exploration Fund Quarterly, 1892 Vol. 24: 24–35.

Contributions to the Encyclopædia Britannica, 11th ed.

Selected works
 Naukratis, Pt. I, Egypt Exploration Fund, 1886.
 Tanis, Pt. I, Egypt Exploration Fund, 1889.
 Egyptian decorative art, London, 1895.
 Migrations, Anthropological Inst. of Great Britain and Ireland, 1906.
 Janus in Modern Life, G. P. Putnam's Sons, 1907.
 
 Eastern Exploration – Past and Future London: Constable and Company Ltd., 1918.
 Some Sources of Human History, Society for Promoting Christian Knowledge, 1919.
 The Status of the Jews in Egypt, G. Allen & Unwin, 1922.
 The Revolutions of Civilization, Harper & Brothers, 1922.

Gallery

References

Further reading

Callaway, Joseph A. "Sir Flinders Petrie, Father of Palestinian Archaeology." Biblical Archaeology Review, 1980 Vol. 6, Issue 6: 44–55.
Drower, Margaret S. Flinders Petrie: A Life in Archaeology, (2nd publication) University of Wisconsin Press, 1995. 
Drower, Margaret S. Letters from the Desert – the Correspondence of Flinders and Hilda Petrie, Aris & Philips, 2004. 
Petrie, William Matthew Flinders. Seventy Years in Archaeology, H. Holt and Company 1932
Picton, Janet; Quicke, Stephen; Roberts, Paul C. (eds). "Living Images: Egyptian Funerary Portraits in the Petrie Museum." 2007. Left Coast Press, Walnut Creek.
Quirke, Stephen. Hidden Hands, Egyptian workforces in Petrie excavation archives, 1880–1924, London 2010 
Schultz, Teresa and Trumpour, Mark, "The Father of Egyptology" in Canada. 2009. Journal of the American Research Centre in Egypt, No. 44, 2008. 159 – 167.
Silberman, Neil Asher. "Petrie's Head: Eugenics and Near Eastern Archaeology", in Alice B. Kehoe and Mary Beth Emmerichs, Assembling the Past (Albuquerque, NM, 1999).
Stevenson, Alice. "'We seem to be working in the same line'. A.H.L.F. Pitt-Rivers and W.M.F. Petrie. Bulletin of the History of Archaeology, 2012 Vol 22, Issue 1: 4–13. 
Trigger, Bruce G. "Paradigms in Sudan Archeology", International Journal of African Historical Studies, vol. 27, no. 2 (1994).
Uphill, E.P. "A Bibliography of Sir William Matthew Flinders Petrie (1853–1942)," Journal of Near Eastern Studies, 1972 Vol. 31: 356–379.

External links

 William Matthew Flinders Petrie: The Father of Egyptian Archaeology, 1853–1942
 
 
 
 
 Manchester Museum
 Hilda Mary Isobel Petrie born Urlin  (1871–1956)
 The Petrie Museum of Egyptian Archaeology in London

1853 births
1942 deaths
Academics of University College London
Archaeologists from London
English Egyptologists
Knights Bachelor
English Anglicans
People from Charlton, London
Fellows of the Royal Society
Burials at Mount Zion (Protestant)
19th-century archaeologists
20th-century archaeologists
Fellows of the British Academy
Historians of weapons
Archaeology and racism